This list of fossil echinoderms described in 2014 is a list of new taxa of echinoderms of every kind that have been described during the year 2014. The list only includes taxa at the level of genus or species.

References

Lists of prehistoric echinoderms
2010s in paleontology
Echinoderms